Nyctemera leopoldi is a moth of the family Erebidae. It is found in Papua, where it has been recorded from the Bird's Head Peninsula (Arfak Mountains) and the Kobowre (Weyland) Mountains. It has also been recorded from Numfor island.

The length of the forewings is 19–22 mm. The forewings are pale grey-brown, the basal half with white veins. The wingfold and longitudinal line in the cell are also white. The hindwings have a broad pale grey-brown hindmargin, fading into the white central area.

References

Nyctemerina
Moths described in 1935